Mariankowo  is a settlement in the administrative district of Gmina Marianowo, within Stargard County, West Pomeranian Voivodeship, in north-western Poland.

References

External links
The town Kolonie Marienfließ in the former rural community Marienfließ in Saatzig county

Mariankowo